Jessy Priskila Rompies (born 14 April 1990) is an Indonesian tennis player. She made her debut as a professional in 2004, aged 14, at an ITF tournament in Jakarta, and is coached by Suzanna Wibowo.

Career
Rompies has played in several junior Grand Slam tournaments. Her best result was reaching the semifinals of the 2008 US Open girls' doubles, partnered by Beatrice Gumulya. Rompies and Gumulya lost the semifinal in a tiebreak.

In February 2009, Rompies represented Indonesia in the 2009 Fed Cup Asia/Oceania Zone Group I tournament. She played two doubles matches and one singles match. In her first match, Rompies and Ayu-Fani Damayanti defeated Ankita Bhambri and Rushmi Chakravarthi of India.

In 2011, Rompies represented Indonesia in the 2011 Fed Cup Asia/Oceania Zone Group II tournament and Group I playoff. She played four doubles matches with partner Yayuk Basuki, winning each match to see her country back in the Asia/Oceania Group I. She won one singles title and three doubles titles on the ITF circuit that year. She played in one WTA tournament in 2011, the Malaysian Open. She successfully represented her country at the 2011 SEA Games in Palembang, winning bronze in the Women's Doubles, Mixed Doubles, and silver for the Women's Team. Rompies again won medals in these three events at the 2015 SEA Games in Singapore. 

Rompies also played in Fed Cup (2012 and 2016). Playing for Indonesia Fed Cup team, she has a win–loss record of 20-16.

WTA Challenger finals

Doubles: 2 (1 title, 1 runner–up)

ITF Circuit finals

Singles: 5 (2 titles, 3 runner–ups)

Doubles: 49 (28 titles, 21 runner–ups)

Note: Tournaments sourced from official ITF archives

ITF Junior finals

Singles: 7 (4 titles, 3 runner-ups)

Doubles: 22 (15 titles, 7 runner-ups) 

Note: Tournaments sourced from official ITF archives

National representation

Multi-sports event

Rompies made her debut representing Indonesia in multi-sports event at the 2009 Southeast Asian Games, she won the women's doubles bronze medal.

Doubles: 5 (1 gold, 5 bronze)

Mixed doubles: 3 (2 silver, 1 bronze)

Notes

References

External links
 
 
 

Indonesian female tennis players
1990 births
Living people
Sportspeople from Jakarta
Tennis players at the 2010 Asian Games
Tennis players at the 2018 Asian Games
Minahasa people
Southeast Asian Games silver medalists for Indonesia
Southeast Asian Games bronze medalists for Indonesia
Southeast Asian Games medalists in tennis
Competitors at the 2009 Southeast Asian Games
Competitors at the 2011 Southeast Asian Games
Competitors at the 2015 Southeast Asian Games
Competitors at the 2017 Southeast Asian Games
Asian Games competitors for Indonesia
Competitors at the 2019 Southeast Asian Games
Southeast Asian Games gold medalists for Indonesia
Competitors at the 2021 Southeast Asian Games
21st-century Indonesian women
Clemson Tigers women's tennis players